D'Entrecasteaux National Park is a national park in Western Australia,  south of Perth.  The park is named after the French Admiral Bruni D'Entrecasteaux who was the first European to sight the area and name Point D'Entrecasteaux in 1792.
The park received 168,497 visitors through 2008–2009.

Description
Black Point is made of basalt columns from a lava flow that occurred 135 million years ago.

The park contains a great variety of scenery, including beaches, sand-dunes, coastal cliffs, coastal heath and pockets of karri forest. Rivers such as the Warren, the Donnelly and the Shannon flow through the park and discharge into the waters off-shore.

Important large scale wetlands, known as the Blackwater, and lakes such as Lake Jasper and Lake Yeagarup are found within the park boundaries.

Broke Inlet is contained within the park boundaries at the eastern end; it is the only inlet in the South West that has not been significantly altered within the catchment area. The gneiss basement rocks project through the shallow waters to form small islands in the Inlet.

Sandy Island in Windy Harbour is part of the park; it is an important nesting site for seabirds, with up to 300,000 breeding pairs of flesh-footed shearwaters, a high proportion of the global population.

Facilities
The park has an entry fee that applies to all visitors.
Facilities available to visitors include barbecues, toilets, 4WD tracks, camp sites, disabled access and picnic areas. Canoeing facilities also exist within the park on the Deep River. Rangers regularly patrol the area.

The Bibbulmun Track passes through the park area.

The outdoor education organisation, Outward Bound, operate within the park taking school groups on hiking expeditions.

See also
 Protected areas of Western Australia
Quagering Island

References

 
National parks of Western Australia
Protected areas established in 1980
1980 establishments in Australia
Warren bioregion